Shoja Mahalleh (also Romanized as Shojāʿ Maḩalleh; also known as Shojāmaḩalleh) is a village in Langarud Rural District, Salman Shahr District, Abbasabad County, Mazandaran Province, Iran. At the 2006 census, its population was 308, in 83 families.

References 

Populated places in Abbasabad County